Fabien Raddas (born 7 March 1980 in Poissy) is a French professional football player. Currently, he plays in the Championnat National 2 for AS Poissy.

He played for Guadeloupe national football team.

External links

1980 births
Living people
French footballers
French people of Guadeloupean descent
Guadeloupean footballers
Guadeloupe international footballers
Ligue 2 players
FC Rouen players
Stade Brestois 29 players
Paris FC players
Stade Lavallois players
AS Cannes players
AS Beauvais Oise players
FC Mantois 78 players
FC Chambly Oise players
AS Poissy players
2007 CONCACAF Gold Cup players
People from Poissy
Association football forwards
Footballers from Yvelines